Corley is an unincorporated community and census-designated place in Shelby County, Iowa, in the United States.  As of the 2010 Census the population of Corley was 26.

Demographics

History
Corley was founded in 1878. Corley's population was 75 in 1902, and 90 in 1925.

Location
Corley has a population of 26 in the 2010 census. It is located 1/7th of a mile from the West Nishnabotna River and is 1/4 of a Mile from the Harlan Municipal Airport. Corley Has A Local Community Club and it also has an antiques store. It is located In-between Harlan Iowa And Avoca Iowa It is one of the two Census Designated Places In Shelby County along with Jacksonville Iowa A Few Miles up the road

Education
The Harlan Community School District operates local public schools.  The district serves the towns of Harlan, Defiance, Earling, Panama, Portsmouth and Westphalia, the unincorporated communities of Jacksonville and Corley, and the surrounding rural areas.

References

Unincorporated communities in Shelby County, Iowa
Census-designated places in Iowa